Heffen is a village and deelgemeente in the municipality of Mechelen in the Belgian province of Antwerp.

Geography 
Heffen occupies 6,95 km² and houses 2122 residents (1 january 2007). The village is located to the north-west of Mechelen at the river Zenne. Heffen was added to the municipality of Mechelen in 1976.

Places of interest
 The parish church, devoted to Our Lady of Perpetual Help, dates back to the 14th century. Its baroque spire from 1755 was destroyed by lightning in 1865. Its octagonal spire from 1866 was demolished in 1899 and replaced by the current spire. The church and its surrounding churchyard are protected as a monument and a landscape.
 The townhouse dating back to 1877.

Demographics

Evolution of the population

19th century

20th century to 1976 municipal reform

Recent census results

References

External links
www.heffen.be

Mechelen
Lordship of Mechelen
Former municipalities of Antwerp Province
Populated places in Antwerp Province